The Jama River is a river of Ecuador in Manabí Province. It runs approximately  out to the Pacific Ocean.

See also
List of rivers of Ecuador

References

 Rand McNally, The New International Atlas, 1993.
 Water Resources Assessment of Ecuador

Rivers of Ecuador